The 2011 Texas Longhorns baseball team represented the University of Texas at Austin in the 2011 NCAA Division I baseball season. The Longhorns played their home games at UFCU Disch-Falk Field. The team was coached by Augie Garrido in his 15th season at Texas.

The Longhorns reached the College World Series, but were eliminated by North Carolina.

Personnel

Roster

Coaches

Schedule

! style="background:#BF5700;color:white;"| Regular Season
|- valign="top" 

|- bgcolor="#ccffcc"
| February 18 ||  || UFCU Disch–Falk Field • Austin, TX || W 8–0 || Jungmann (1–0) || Beck (0–1) || None || 6,516 || 1–0 ||
|- align="center" bgcolor="#ffbbb"
| February 19 || Maryland || UFCU Disch–Falk Field • Austin, TX || L 1–10 || Carroll (1–0) || Green (0–1) || None ||  || 1–1 || 
|- bgcolor="#ccffcc"
| February 19 || Maryland || UFCU Disch–Falk Field • Austin, TX || W 7–4 || McKirahan (1–0) || Ghysels (0–1) || Thomas (1) || 6,982 || 2–1 || 
|- bgcolor="#ccffcc"
| February 20 || Maryland || UFCU Disch–Falk Field • Austin, TX || W 16–0 || Milner (1–0) || Kirkpatrick (0–1) || None || 6,415 || 3–1 || 
|- align="center" bgcolor="#ffbbb"
| February 22 ||  || UFCU Disch–Falk Field • Austin, TX || L 7–8 || Meza (2–0) || Nuncio (0–1) || Simko (1) || 5,187 || 3–2 || 
|- bgcolor="#ccffcc"
| February 25 || @  || Les Murakami Stadium • Honolulu, HI || W 2–0 || Jungmann (2–0) || Sisto (0–1) || None || 4,684 || 4–2 || 
|- align="center" bgcolor="#ffbbb"
| February 26 || @ Hawaii || Les Murakami Stadium • Honolulu, HI || L 4–515 || Gallagher (1–0) || Knebel (0–1) || None || 3,943 || 4–3 || 
|- bgcolor="#ccffcc"
| February 27 || @ Hawaii || Les Murakami Stadium • Honolulu, HI || W 4–3 || Stafford (1–0) || Moore (0–1) || Nuncio (1) || 3,705 || 5–3 || 
|-

|- bgcolor="#ccffcc"
| March 4 || #14  || UFCU Disch–Falk Field • Austin, TX || W 4–3 || Jungmann (3–0) || Appel (0–2) || Knebel (1) || 6,368 || 6–3 || 
|- align="center" bgcolor="ffbbb"
| March 5 || #14 Stanford || UFCU Disch–Falk Field • Austin, TX || L 2–9 || McArdle (2–0) || Green (0–2) || None || 7,228 || 6–4 || 
|- bgcolor="#ccffcc"
| March 6 || #14 Stanford || UFCU Disch–Falk Field • Austin, TX || W 4–2 || Stafford (2–0) || Pries (2–1) || Knebel (2) || 6,666 || 7–4 || 
|- bgcolor="#ccffcc"
| March 8 ||  || UFCU Disch–Falk Field • Austin, TX || W 8–511 || Knebel (1–1) || Clarke (0–1) || None || 5,465 || 8–4 || 
|- bgcolor="#ccffcc"
| March 11 ||  || UFCU Disch–Falk Field • Austin, TX || W 8–0 || Jungmann (4–0) || Kimball (0–1) || None || 6,026 || 9–4 || 
|- bgcolor="#ccffcc"
| March 12 || Brown || UFCU Disch–Falk Field • Austin, TX || W 4–37 || Milner (2–0) || Carlow (0–2) || Knebel (3) ||  || 10–4 || 
|- align="center" bgcolor="ffbbb"
| March 12 || Brown || UFCU Disch–Falk Field • Austin, TX || L 3–7 || Galan (1–0) || Nuncio (0–2) || None || 6,399 || 10–5 || 
|- bgcolor="#ccffcc"
| March 13 || Brown || UFCU Disch–Falk Field • Austin, TX || W 11–17 || Green (1–2) || Whitehill (0–2) || None || 5,670 || 11–5 || 
|- bgcolor="#ccffcc"
| March 15 ||  || UFCU Disch–Falk Field • Austin, TX || W 3–1 || McKirahan (2–0) || Colon (1–2) || Knebel (4) || 7,007 || 12–5 || 
|- bgcolor="#ccffcc"
| March 18 ||  || UFCU Disch–Falk Field • Austin, TX || W 3–0 || Jungmann (5–0) || Hunter (2–1) || Knebel (5) || 6,758 || 13–5 || 1–0
|- bgcolor="#ccffcc"
| March 19 || Kansas State || UFCU Disch–Falk Field • Austin, TX || W 4–310 || Knebel (2–1) || Allen (1–1) || None || 6,824 || 14–5 || 2–0
|- bgcolor="#ccffcc"
| March 20 || Kansas State || UFCU Disch–Falk Field • Austin, TX || W 6–514 || Carrillo (1–0) || Esquivel (0–1) || None || 6,334 || 15–5 || 3–0
|- bgcolor="#ccffcc"
| March 23 ||  || UFCU Disch–Falk Field • Austin, TX || W 12–07 || Stafford (3–0) || Storey (0–4) || None || 5,359 || 16–5 || 
|- bgcolor="#ccffcc"
| March 25 || @  || Allie P. Reynolds Stadium • Stillwater, OK || W 1–015 || Carrillo (2–0) || Marlowe (1–2) || None || 1,159 || 17–5 || 4–0
|- align="center" bgcolor="ffbbb"
| March 26 || @ Oklahoma State || Allie P. Reynolds Stadium • Stillwater, OK || L 1–3 || Propst (4–1) || Milner (2–1) || None || 864 || 17–6 || 4–1
|- align="center" bgcolor="ffbbb"
| March 27 || @ Oklahoma State || Allie P. Reynolds Stadium • Stillwater, OK || L 3–10 || McCurry (2–0) || Bellow (0–1) || None || 352 || 17–7 || 4–2
|- bgcolor="#ccffcc"
| March 29 ||  || UFCU Disch–Falk Field • Austin, TX || W 2–1 || McKirahan (3–0) || Gonzalez (2–4) || Knebel (6) || 5,435 || 18–7 || 
|-

|- bgcolor="#ccffcc"
| April 1 || Missouri || UFCU Disch–Falk Field • Austin, TX || W 5–4 || JUngmann (6–0) || Emens (1–1) || Milner (1) || 6,337 || 19–7 || 5–2
|- bgcolor="#ccffcc"
| April 2 || Missouri || UFCU Disch–Falk Field • Austin, TX || W 5–2 || Milner (3–1) || Stites (1–2) || Knebel (7) || 7,035 || 20–7 || 6–2
|- bgcolor="#ccffcc"
| April 3 || Missouri || UFCU Disch–Falk Field • Austin, TX || W 10–1 || Green (2–2) || Hardoin (2–4) || None || 6,505 || 21–7 || 7–2
|- bgcolor="#ccffcc"
| April 5 || @  || Whataburger Field • Corpus Christi, TX || W 8–1 || Stafford (4–0) || Simko (5–4) || None || 6,159 || 22–7 || 
|- bgcolor="#ccffcc"
| April 8 || @  || Baylor Ballpark • Waco, TX || W 11–3 || Jungmann (7–0) || Verrett (3–3) || None || 3,908 || 23–7 || 8–2
|- align="center" bgcolor="ffbbb"
| April 9 || @ Baylor || Baylor Ballpark • Waco, TX || L 6–7 || Turley (2–1) || Milner (3–2) || Garner (2) || 3,771 || 23–8 || 8–3
|- bgcolor="#ccffcc"
| April 10 || Baylor || UFCU Disch–Falk Field • Austin, TX || W 5–2 || Stafford (5–0) || Kuntz (0–1) || Knebel (8) || 6,209 || 24–8 || 9–3
|- bgcolor="#ccffcc"
| April 12 ||  || UFCU Disch–Falk Field • Austin, TX || W 3–1 || Thornill (1–0) || Stafford (3–3) || Knebel (9) || 5,894 || 25–8 || 
|- bgcolor="#ccffcc"
| April 15 ||  || UFCU Disch–Falk Field • Austin, TX || W 4–1 || Jungmann (8–0) || Paiz (3–2) || Knebel (10) || 7,286 || 26–8 || 10–3
|- align="center" bgcolor="ffbbb"
| April 16 || Texas Tech || UFCU Disch–Falk Field • Austin, TX || L 1–2 || Masek (2–2) || Green (2–3) || Neely (5) || 7,201 || 26–9 || 10–4
|- bgcolor="#ccffcc"
| April 17 || Texas Tech || UFCU Disch–Falk Field • Austin, TX || W 3–1 || Milner (4–2) || Flora (0–3) || Knebel (11) || 7,067 || 27–9 || 11–4
|- bgcolor="#ccffcc"
| April 19 ||  || UFCU Disch–Falk Field • Austin, TX || W 4–2 || Carrillo (3–0) || Kotchie (1–3) || Knebel (12) || 5,523 || 28–9 || 
|- bgcolor="#ccffcc"
| April 21 || @  || Hoglund Ballpark • Lawrence, KS || W 9–0 || Jungmann (9–0) || Taylor (4–2) || None || 901 || 29–9 || 12–4
|- bgcolor="#ccffcc"
| April 22 || @ Kansas || Hoglund Ballpark • Lawrence, KS || W 9–1 || Green (3–3) || Walz (5–4) || None || 1,306 || 30–9 || 13–4
|- align="center" bgcolor="ffbbb"
| April 23 || @ Kansas || Hoglund Ballpark • Lawrence, KS || L 2–4 || Poppe (2–4) || Stafford (5–1) || Murray (7) || 1,620 || 30–10 || 13–5
|- bgcolor="#ccffcc"
| April 26 ||  || UFCU Disch–Falk Field • Austin, TX || W 2–0 || Carrillo (4–0) || Colon (1–4) || Knebel (13) || 6,636 || 31–10 || 
|- bgcolor="#ccffcc"
| April 29 || #15  || UFCU Disch–Falk Field • Austin, TX || W 5–0 || Jungmann (10–0) || Rocha (8–2) || None || 7,339 || 32–10 || 14–5
|- bgcolor="#ccffcc"
| April 30 || #15 Oklahoma || UFCU Disch–Falk Field • Austin, TX || W 4–3 || Green (4–3) || Smith (7–3) || Knebel (14) || 7,106 || 33–10 || 15–5
|-

|- align="center" bgcolor="ffbbb"
| May 1 || #15  || UFCU Disch–Falk Field • Austin, TX || L 2–5 || Overton (7–3) || Stafford (5–2) || None || 6,777 || 33–11 || 15–6
|- bgcolor="#ccffcc"
| May 3 ||  || UFCU Disch–Falk Field • Austin, TX || W 8–0 || Thornill (2–0) || Simmons (4–5) || None || 5,713 || 34–11 || 
|- bgcolor="#ccffcc"
| May 6 || @  || Haymarket Park • Lincoln, NE || W 5–3 || Jungmann (11–0) || Freeman (5–5) || Knebel (15) || 3,871 || 35–11 || 16–6
|- bgcolor="#ccffcc"
| May 7 || @ Nebraska || Haymarket Park • Lincoln, NE || W 16–5 || Green (5–3) || Keller (2–5) || None || 4,101 || 36–11 || 17–6
|- align="center" bgcolor="ffbbb"
| May 8 || @ Nebraska || Haymarket Park • Lincoln, NE || L 3–6 || Niederklein (7–2) || Milner (4–3) || Hauptman (8) || 3,018 || 36–12 || 17–7
|- bgcolor="#ccffcc"
| May 14 ||  || UFCU Disch–Falk Field • Austin, TX || W 2–111 || Milner (5–3) || Cook (0–2) || None ||  || 37–12 || 
|- bgcolor="#ccffcc"
| May 14 || Texas Southern || UFCU Disch–Falk Field • Austin, TX || W 11–07 || Green (6–3) || Schulba (1–4) || None || 7,685 || 38–12 || 
|- bgcolor="#ccffcc"
| May 19 || @ #11 Texas A&M || Olsen Field at Blue Bell Park • College Station, TX || W 4–2 || Jungmann (12–0) || Stilson (5–2) || None || 7,082 || 37–17 || 18–7
|- bgcolor="#ccffcc"
| May 20 || #11 Texas A&M || UFCU Disch–Falk Field • Austin, TX || W 6–4 || Milner (6–3) || Hinojosa (2–2) || Knebel (16) || 7,785 || 40–12 || 19–7
|- align="center" bgcolor="ffbbb"
| May 21 || #11 Texas A&M || UFCU Disch–Falk Field • Austin, TX || L 0–3 || Stripling (12–2) || Knebel (2–2) || None || 7,533 || 40–13 || 19–8
|-

|-
! style="background:#BF5700;color:white;"| Post-Season
|-

|- align="center" bgcolor="ffbbb"
| May 25 || (8) Missouri || RedHawks Field • Oklahoma City, OK || L 4–6 || Anderson (3–0) || Carrillo (4–1) || McCormick (7) || 3,810 || 40–14 || 0–1
|- bgcolor="#ccffcc"
| May 26 || (5)  || RedHawks Field • Oklahoma City, OK || W 6–1 || Jungmann (13–0) || Turley (3–5) || None || 3,432 || 41–14 || 1–1
|- bgcolor="#ccffcc"
| May 27 || (4)  || RedHawks Field • Oklahoma City, OK || W 9–3 || Green (7–3) || Heaney (7–4) || None || 4,954 || 42–14 || 2–1
|- bgcolor="#ccffcc"
| May 28 || (8) Missouri || RedHawks Field • Oklahoma City, OK || W 6–1 || Carrillo (5–1) || Stites (3–6) || None || 4,257 || 43–14 || 3–1
|- align="center" bgcolor="ffbbb"
| May 28 || (8) Missouri || RedHawks Field • Oklahoma City, OK || L 1–2 || Fick (2–2) || Milner (6–4) || McCormick (8) || 4,062 || 43–15 || 3–2
|-

|- bgcolor="#ccffcc"
| June 3 || (4)  || UFCU Disch–Falk Field • Austin, TX || W 5–3 || Stafford (6–2) || Hermans (5–2) || Knebel (17) || 6,110 || 44–15 || 1–0
|- align="center" bgcolor="ffbbb"
| June 4 || #24 (3)  || UFCU Disch–Falk Field • Austin, TX || L 5–7 || Chafin (8–1) || Jungmann (13–1) || McMillen (18) || 6,268 || 44–16 || 1–1
|- bgcolor="#ccffcc"
| June 5 || (2)  || UFCU Disch–Falk Field • Austin, TX || W 4–3 || Knebel (3–2) || McVaney (1–3) || None || 5,178 || 45–16 || 2–1
|- bgcolor="#ccffcc"
| June 5 || #24 (3) Kent State || UFCU Disch–Falk Field • Austin, TX || W 9–3 || Thornill (3–0) || Starn (9–3) || Carrillo (1–1) || 5,601 || 46–16 || 3–1
|- bgcolor="#ccffcc"
| June 6 || #24 (3) Kent State || UFCU Disch–Falk Field • Austin, TX || W 5–0 || Carrillo (6–1) || Mace (5–3) || None || 5,917 || 47–16 || 4–1
|-

|- align="center" bgcolor="ffbbb"
| June 10 || #10  || UFCU Disch–Falk Field • Austin, TX || L 1–3 || Rodgers (9–4) || Jungmann (13–2) || Lambson (9) || 7,235 || 47–17 || 4–2
|- bgcolor="#ccffcc"
| June 11 || #10 Arizona State || UFCU Disch–Falk Field • Austin, TX || W 5–1 || Green (8–3) || Champlin (9–4) || Knebel (18) || 7,278 || 48–17 || 5–2
|- bgcolor="#ccffcc"
| June 12 || #10 Arizona State || UFCU Disch–Falk Field • Austin, TX || W 4–2 || Milner (7–4) || Lambson (7–4) || Knebel (19) || 7,172 || 49–17 || 6–2
|-

|- align="center" bgcolor="ffbbb"
| June 18 || #1 (2) Florida || TD Ameritrade Park • Omaha, NE || L 4–8 || Randall (11–3) || Jungmann (13–3) || Maronde (3) || 25,521 || 49–18 || 0–1
|- align="center" bgcolor="ffbbb"
| June 20 || #7 (3) North Carolina || TD Ameritrade Park • Omaha, NE || L 0–3 || Emanuel (9–1) || Green (8–4) || None || 19,630 || 49–19 || 0–2
|-

Ranking movements

References

Texas Longhorns baseball seasons
Texas Longhorns
College World Series seasons
Big 12 Conference baseball champion seasons
Texas Longhorns base
Texas